Sir Paul Lever KCMG (born 31 March 1944) is a retired British ambassador.

Career
Paul Lever was educated at St Paul's School, London and The Queen's College, Oxford. He joined the Diplomatic Service on leaving Oxford in 1966. After a year at the Foreign and Commonwealth Office (FCO) he was sent to Finland to learn Finnish and served at the embassy in Helsinki 1967–71. He later served as chef de cabinet to Christopher Tugendhat, then vice-president of the EEC, and as head successively of the UN, Defence, and Security Policy departments in the FCO. He was head of the UK delegation to the Conference on Security and Co-operation in Europe in Vienna, with the rank of Ambassador, 1990–92; assistant Under-Secretary at the FCO 1992–94; chairman of the Joint Intelligence Committee 1994–96; Director for EU and Economic Affairs at the FCO 1996–97; and Ambassador to Germany 1997–2003.

Lever retired from the Diplomatic Service in 2003 and was Global Development Director, RWE Thames Water, 2003–06 and Chairman of the Royal United Services Institute 2004–09.

Books

His book Berlin Rules: Europe and the German Way (2017) argued that Germany is the dominant power in the European Union, and uses that power to protect the German economy. Lever argues that a federal Europe seems nonthreatening to federal Germany, and by embracing pan-Europeanism they can escape their past.

Honours
Lever was appointed CMG in 1991 and knighted KCMG in the 1998 New Year Honours. He was awarded an honorary LLD degree by Birmingham University in 2001 and an honorary fellowship of his alma mater, The Queen's College, Oxford, in 2006.

Works
 Europa in zehn Jahren: wie wird es aussehen?. Vortrag. Hamburg : Übersee-Club, 2002
 Berlin Rules: Europe and the German Way. Tauris, 2017

References

External links
Interview with Sir Paul Lever, British Diplomatic Oral History Programme, Churchill College, Cambridge, 7 November 2011

1944 births
Living people
People educated at St Paul's School, London
Alumni of The Queen's College, Oxford
Members of HM Diplomatic Service
Organization for Security and Co-operation in Europe
Chairs of the Joint Intelligence Committee (United Kingdom)
Ambassadors of the United Kingdom to Germany
Knights Commander of the Order of St Michael and St George
20th-century British diplomats